Outdoor heating allows people to stay in substantially unenclosed spaces, when it would otherwise be too cold to do so. To this end, various outdoor heating appliances are available, including gas patio heaters, quartz or ceramic electric lamps, and wood burning chimenea and fire pits.

In an outdoor environment, convection would quickly carry away heat in the form of hot air, so all these methods emit various amounts of their total output as radiant heat. Radiant heat is emitted from the appliance, and is absorbed by objects and people, raising their temperature.

Heating